Sadleir may refer to:

People with the surname
 Franc Sadleir (1775–1851), Irish academic
 James Sadleir (c.1815 – 1881), Irish financier and politician
 John Sadleir (1813–1856), Irish financier and politician
 Lynette Sadleir (b. 1963), Canadian-born swimmer
 Michael Sadleir (1888–1957), British author and bibliophile
 Ralph Sadleir (1579–1661), English landowner
 Thomas Sadleir (died 1607) (c.1536–1607), English landowner and politician
 Thomas Sadleir (1882–1957), Irish genealogist and herald
 Lionel Sadleir-Jackson (1876–1932), British army officer

Places
 Sadleir, New South Wales

See also
 Sadleirian Professor of Pure Mathematics, University of Cambridge
 Saddler (disambiguation)
 Sadler (disambiguation)
 Sadlier, a surname